Azamgarh district is one of the three districts of Azamgarh division in the Indian state of Uttar Pradesh.

Etymology
The district is named after its headquarters town, Azamgarh. Azam, a son of Vikramajit, founded the town in 1665. Vikramajit, a descendant of Gautam of Mehnagar in pargana Nizamabad, had embraced the faith of Islam. He had two sons, namely, Azam and Azmat.

History

Towards the end of the 16th century, a Gautam Rajput from Azamgarh district was assimilated into the Mughal court at Delhi, where he had gone in search of greater influence. His mission was a success, with the royal court eventually awarding him 22 parganas in the Azamgarh region that marked the establishment of a family line which culminated in his descendants becoming rajas of the area. This was a typical route whereby relatively obscure lineages rose to prominence.

Colonial era
The district was ceded to the British in 1801 by the wazirs of Lucknow. Both Hindu and Muslim landowners (known as Rautaras) of Azamgarh aided the Sepoy Mutiny against the British in 1857. On 3 June 1857 the 17th Regiment of Native Infantry mutinied at Azamgarh, murdered some of their officers, and carried off the government treasure to Faizabad. The district became a centre of the fighting between the Gurkhas and the rebels, and was brought under control in October 1858 by Colonel Kelly. The most notable rebels were Late. Janab Lal Mohammed Chivtahvin. Later, many of the local land owners were crushed by the British. Later, residents of Azamgarh participated in various national movements including the Civil Disobedience Movement and the Quit India Movement in 1942. The historian, social reformer, nationalist Mahapandit Rahul Sankrityayan was born in Kanaila village in this district.

Geography
The district lies between the Ganges and the Ghagahara. Azamgarh district is surrounded by the districts of Mau in the east, Gorakhpur in the north, Ghazipur in the south-east, Jaunpur in the south-west, Sultanpur in the west and Ambedkar Nagar in the north-west.

The slope of the land is from northwest to southeast. Roughly speaking, the district consists of a series of parallel ridges, whose summits are depressed into beds or hollows, along which the rivers flow; while between the ridges are low-lying rice lands, interspersed with numerous natural reservoirs.

Azamgarh district is further divided into 7 sub-districts, and 22 development blocks. There are 4,106 villages (3,792 inhabited and 314 uninhabited) in the district.

Education

Colleges

 Government Medical College, Azamgarh is a state medical college located at Chakrapanpur, Azamgarh.
 Government Engineering College, Azamgarh is a constituent college of Dr. A.P.J. Abdul Kalam Technical University (formerly Uttar Pradesh Technical University) and has its campus at Madan Mohan Malaviya University of Technology in Gorakhpur.
 Shibli National College, Azamgarh located at Azamgarh District . It is affiliated to Veer Bahadur Singh Purvanchal University. Jaunpur

Important places in Azamgarh district
According to the district's official website, the nine important places in Azamgarh district are:-

 Azamgarh City
 Nizamabad
 Maharajganj
 Mubarakpur
 Mehnagar
 Durvasa
 Dattatreya
 Govindsahab
 Avantikapuri (Awank)

Economy
In 2006 the Ministry of Panchayati Raj named Azamgarh one of the country's 250 most backward districts (out of a total of 640). It is one of the 34 districts in Uttar Pradesh currently receiving funds from the Backward Regions Grant Fund Programme (BRGF).

Demographics

According to the 2011 census Azamgarh district has a population of 4,613,913, This gives it a ranking of 30th in India (out of a total of 640). Its population growth rate over the decade 2001-2011 was 17.11%. Azamgarh has a sex ratio of 1019 females for every 1000 males, and a literacy rate of 72.69%. Scheduled Castes made up 25.39% of the population.

The population consists of 393,401 urban and 4,220,512 rural; 2,137,805 females and 2,082,707 males. The literacy rate is 70.93%.

Languages
The official language is Hindi and additional official is Urdu.  Bhojpuri is the native language of Azamgarh. The Bhojpuri variant of Kaithi is the indigenous script of Bhojpuri language.

At the time of the 2011 Census of India, 55.58% of the population in the district spoke Bhojpuri, 35.28% Hindi and 8.21% Urdu as their first language.

Local media

Mostly all major English, Hindi and Urdu dailies including The Times of India, Hindustan Times, The Hindu, Dainik Jagran, Amar Ujala, Hindustan, Rashtree Sahara, Inquilab, Hausla News, Third eyes, Dainik Manasha Mail. Hindi and Urdu dailies also have their bureaus in the city. Almost all big Hindi TV news channel have stringers in the city.

Notable people
Notable people from Azamgarh district include:-
NB This list excludes those from Azamgarh itself which are listed in that article

Azmi is a common toponymic surname among Indian Muslims from Azamgarh.
 Abdul Haq Azmi (1928–2016), Indian Islamic scholar, cousin-uncle of Rana Ayyub
 Abdul Lateef Azmi (1917–2002), Indian Urdu writer
 Abu Azmi (born 1955), Indian politician, MLA from Maharashtra and former Member of Rajya Sabha
 Ahmad Ali Barqi Azmi (born 1954), Indian Urdu poet
 Azizullah Azmi (1929–2010), Indian politician, MP of Lok Sabha
 Baba Azmi, Indian film cinematographer, husband of Tanvi Azmi
 Habib al-Rahman al-'Azmi (1901-1992), Indian Islamic scholar of hadith and fiqh 
 Iliyas Azmi (born 1934), Indian politician, MP of Lok Sabha
 Kaifi Azmi (1919–2002) was an Indian Urdu poet, husband of Shaukat Azmi and father of Shabana Azmi
 Khaleel-Ur-Rehman Azmi (1927–1978), Indian Urdu poet and literary critic 
 Mohammed Badi Uzzaman Azmi (1939–2011), British-Pakistani television and film actor
 Muhammad Mustafa Azmi (1930–2017), Indian Islamic scholar of hadith
 Mushtaq Ahmed Azmi (1919–2011), Indian adult educationist and UNESCO official
 Obaidullah Khan Azmi (born 1949), Indian politician, MP of Rajya Sabha
 Seema Azmi, Indian actress of film and stage
 Shahid Azmi (1977–2010), Indian human rights lawyer
 Shakeel Azmi (born 1971), Indian Urdu lyricist and poet
 Waqar Azmi (born 1970), British-Indian civil servant
 Shaikh Shamim Ahmed Azmi (1938–2019), former MLA and Indian National Congress leader from Mumbai
 Qamaruzzaman Azmi (born 1946), Indian Islamic scholar
Saeed-ur-Rahman Azmi Nadvi (born 1934), Indian Islamic scholar
 Mirza Aslam Beg - Chief of army staff of Pakistan Army in 1987–1991
 Bisram, Bhojpuri writer and poet
 Hamiduddin Farahi - religious scholar, educationist, writer, chief administrator of Madrasatul Islah - from Fariha village
 Amin Ahsan Islahi - Islamic scholar - from Bamhur village
 Aslam Jairajpuri - Islamic scholar
 Shamim Jairajpuri - zoologist
 Zafarul Islam Khan - Chairman of Delhi Minority Commission, Author and Journalist based in New Delhi. He is currently editor and publisher of The Milli Gazette
 Wahiduddin Khan - Indian Islamic Scholar and peace activist known for having written a commentary on the Quran and having translated it into contemporary English. He has been listed in the 500 Most Influential Muslims of the world. Padma Bhusan
 Chhannulal Mishra -  Hindustani classical singer.
 Laxmi Narayan Mishra - modern Hindi dramatist
 Shibli Nomani - Islamic scholar
 Prem Chand Pandey - Indian scientist and academic
 Shyam Narayan Pandey - writer and poet - from Dumraon village, (now in Mau district but was in Azamgarh district at the time)
 Badri Nath Prasad, mathematician, founder of The Allahabad Mathematical Society
 Vibhuti Narain Rai - former IPS officer and former Vice Chancellor - Mahatma Gandhi Antarrashtriya Hindi Vishwavidyalaya
 Rahul Sankrityayan - Hindi Travel writer - from Kanaila Village
 Prakash Singh - DGP-Police, BSF Indian Police Reform movement (Honoured with Padma Shri Award and presidents Police Medal)
 Vinod K. Singh - (Padma Shri), director - Indian Institute of Science Education and Research, Bhopal.
 Ayodhya Prasad Upadhyay - Hindi poet - from Nizamabad
 Kausar Yazdani - Islamic scholar born 1935.

Tehsil/Town in Azamgarh district

 Azamgarh
 Burhanpur
 Lalganj
 Mehnagar
 Nizamabad
 Phulpur
 Sagri
 Martinganj

See also
 Banahara
 Chaukiganjor

Notes

References

External links

 
Districts of Uttar Pradesh